Madrepora aspera is an unaccepted scientific name and may refer to two species of corals:
 Acropora aspera as described by Dana, 1846
 Echinophyllia aspera as described by Ellis & Solander, 1786